Novy Kipchak (Yañı Qıpsaq) is a rural locality (a village) in Kipchak-Askarovsky Selsoviet, Alsheyevsky District, Bashkortostan, Russia. The population was 148 as of 2010. There are 2 streets.

Geography 
Novy Kipchak is located 30 km southeast of Rayevsky (the district's administrative centre) by road. Saryshevo is the nearest rural locality.

References 

Rural localities in Alsheyevsky District